The Shelbourne 600 is a greyhound racing competition held annually at Shelbourne Park in Ringsend, Dublin, Ireland.  

It is one of the leading competitions for stayers in the Irish racing greyhound racing calendar and was inaugurated in 1964.

Past winners

Venues & Distances
1964–present (Shelbourne 600 yards)

Sponsors
1964–1999 (Guinness) 
2000–2009 (Ladbrokes)
2010–2011 (Hegarty Bookmakers)
2012–2012 (Betfair) 
2013–2013 (Ladbrokes)
2014–2019 (Gain)

References

Greyhound racing competitions in Dublin (city)
Recurring sporting events established in 1964
1964 establishments in Ireland